B. V. Abdulla Koya (1914–1998) was an Indian politician from Kerala. He was elected to Indian Parliament (Rajya Sabha) from Kerala several times (1967–1973, 1974–1980, 1980–1986, 1986–1992 and 1992–1998) with the Indian Union Muslim League.

References

1914 births
1998 deaths
Rajya Sabha members from Kerala
Indian Union Muslim League politicians